Mirek Topolánek's First Cabinet was Cabinet of the Czech Republic from 4 September 2006 to 9 January 2007. The cabinet consisted of members of Civic Democratic Party (ODS) and non-partisans. On 3 October 2006 the cabinet did not pass through Confidence and supply in Chamber of Deputies of the Parliament of the Czech Republic by 96 to 99.

Government ministers 

Czech government cabinets
Cabinets established in 2006
2006 in the Czech Republic
Civic Democratic Party (Czech Republic)
Mirek Topolánek